The women's freestyle 72 kilograms is a competition featured at the 2022 World Wrestling Championships, and was held in Belgrade, Serbia on 14 and 15 September 2022. The qualification rounds were held on 14 September while medal matches were held on the 2nd day of the competition. A total of 14 wrestlers competed in this event, limited to athletes whose body weight was less than 72 kilograms. 

This freestyle wrestling competition consists of a single-elimination tournament, with a repechage used to determine the winner of two bronze medals. The two finalists face off for gold and silver medals. Each wrestler who loses to one of the two finalists moves into the repechage, culminating in a pair of bronze medal matches featuring the semifinal losers each facing the remaining repechage opponent from their half of the bracket.

Amit Elor of the United States of America won the gold medal after beating Zhamila Bakbergenova from Kazakhstan 10–0 after only one minute and twelve seconds.

Alexandra Anghel from Romania and Masako Furuichi of Japan shared the bronze medals. Anghel beat Oknazarova from Uzbekistan convincingly while Furuichi edged Buse Tosun of Turkey 3–2.

Results
Legend
F — Won by fall

Main bracket

Repechage

Final standing

References

 Results book

External links
Official website

Women's freestyle 72 kg
2022 in women's sport wrestling